The T. G. Shevchenko (formerly Taras Shevchenko) is a Dmitriy Furmanov-class (project 302, BiFa129MK) Soviet/Ukrainian/Kazakh river cruise ship, cruising in the Neva – Volga – Don – Dnepr – Black Sea basin, from Nesebar on the Bulgarian Black Sea Coast and Constanța to Saint Petersburg on the Baltic Sea in Russia, and since November 2010 hotelship in the Kurmangazy oil field in the Kazakh section of the Caspian Sea. The ship was built by Elbewerft Boizenburg at their shipyard in Boizenburg, Germany, named after Ukrainian painter and poet Taras Shevchenko and entered service in 1991. Her home port is currently Aktau.

Features
The ship has two restaurants: Odessa restaurant (84 places) on the Boat deck and Kyiv restaurant (176 places) on the Upper deck, two bars: Odessa Bar (84 places, Boat deck) and Panorama Bar (50 places, Boat deck), the lounge on the Upper deck, conference hall (for up to 220 people) and souvenir shop. The Taras Shevchenko has been purchased by Viking River Cruises to become the Viking Akun starting service in 2014.

See also
 List of river cruise ships
 MS Taras Shevchenko (1967)

References

External links

Т. Г. Шевченко (Тарас Шевченко → 1992) 

1991 ships
River cruise ships